Chu Chu and the Philly Flash is a 1981 American comedy film starring Alan Arkin, Carol Burnett, Jack Warden, Ruth Buzzi, Adam Arkin and Danny Aiello. It was directed by David Lowell Rich and produced by Jay Weston, with the screenplay being written by Arkin's wife, Barbara Dana. Arkin plays a down-on-his-luck former baseball player and Burnett plays a Carmen Miranda-style performer.

It was released in 1981 by 20th Century Fox. The film received negative reviews from critics and was a box office bomb. Many of the scenes, particularly the exterior scenes of Chu Chu's home, were filmed in San Francisco's Potrero Hill district.

Plot
Flash used to be a talented baseball player, but now he's a homeless recovering alcoholic who sells stolen watches on the streets of San Francisco, California. Elsewhere, Emily Laedecker, better known as Chu Chu, is a one-woman Latin band who wears a Carmen Miranda-inspired outfit who performs on the waterfront to make money, but she is angered when Flash arrives to sell watches in her public performance space. Luck seems to smile at them when they find a briefcase with stolen government documents in it. So they scheme to return it to its rightful owner but only if they can get $50 for their trouble, maybe even more. Instead of the expected reward money, all they get is a load of trouble with a variety of agents coming after them to get the briefcase and the documents back.

Cast
 Alan Arkin as Philly Flash
 Carol Burnett as Emily "Chu Chu" Laedecker
 Jack Warden as The Commander
 Danny Aiello as Johnson
 Adam Arkin as Charlie
 Danny Glover as Morgan
 Sid Haig as Vince
 Vincent Schiavelli as B.J.
 Ruth Buzzi as Consuelo
 Vito Scotti as Vittorio
 Lou Jacobi as Landlord

Productions and background
In January 1974 it was announced the film was the third script from Broadway lyricist Bob Merrill, the others being Mahogany and Freaky Friday. It was about a Puerto Rican prostitute and a Bowery wino who claims he used to be a baseball pitcher. Merrill wanted to make it for Columbia.

In January 1975, it was announced that the film would be a joint venture between Raquel Welch Productions, Columbia Pictures and Monroe Sachson Productions with Raquel Welch playing the part of Chu Chu. Ron Talsky, who was dating Welch at the time, was set to produce the movie with Robert Merrill writing the screenplay. However, Columbia was nervous about Talsky producing the film and said they were re-evaluating the project. Eventually, Columbia pulled out of the project, as did Welch, Sachson and Merrill, Talsky was the only participant from the original Welch venture to actually be a part of the final film. Talsky did not remain a producer on the movie, but instead was hired as the film's costume designer.

Alan Arkin became involved with the project after a chance meeting with Jay Weston. Arkin agreed to star in the film under the condition that his wife, Barbara Dana, be allowed to rewrite the script. (She had written children's books, folk songs and another script with her husband.) Arkin spent the next seven years developing the film with Weston. Dana had a small role in the film, and Arkin's three children, Adam Arkin, Matthew Arkin and Tony Arkin also had roles in the film.

"We wanted to say something positive about people," said Dana. Arkin called it "the best script I've read in years."

In April 1980 it was announced that Arkin would appear in the film alongside Carol Burnett for Melvin Simon Productions. The director was David Lowell Rich who had done a TV movie with Arkin, The Defection of Simas Kudirka.

Shooting
Principal photography for the film began on August 20, 1980, with location filming in San Francisco and Los Angeles, California. According to production notes, San Francisco locations included Alta Plaza Park, the China Basin and Potrero Hill. Interior sets were built at the U.S. Navy hangar on San Francisco's Treasure Island. On October 31, 1980, principal photography was completed.

Reception
In her review for The New York Times, Janet Maslin wrote "considering the caliber of its leading players, Chu Chu and the Philly Flash is an amazingly charmless movie. Alan Arkin and Carol Burnett might be expected to generate some interest by virtue of their mere presence in the film, but they are teamed up for a painfully contrived tale, playing lovable losers who aren't lovable at all. Flash (Mr. Arkin) is a dim-witted derelict graced with childlike innocence, and Emily (Miss Burnett) gets to wear bananas in her ears, so the roles are not without their appealing sides. But the movie itself is almost entirely flat... Miss Burnett's wardrobe, by Bob Mackie, is the funniest thing in the movie".

People was critical of the film, writing "this empty vehicle is going nowhere" and writing about Arkin and Burnett's performance: "together they're meant to be one of those wonderfully wacky cinematic odd couples. They're more like a pair on an uncomfortable blind date... but chemistry is everything in a film like this one, and synergy is one thing these two talented performers don't have. Burnett fares marginally better, instilling a hint of pathos in the down-and-out dancer. Arkin, though he seldom speaks below a shout and expends endless energy, might as well be playing to a lamppost for all the emotion he musters.

In the December 1981 issue of Rolling Stone, Chu Chu and the Philly Flash was listed in the article titled "Big Bucks, Big Losers – Twenty-Four Films That Bombed in 1981". The article stated the film's production budget was $7 million, and its domestic rentals were less than $100,000.

References

External links
 
 
 
 

1980s American films
1980s English-language films
1981 comedy films
1981 films
20th Century Fox films
American comedy films
Fictional couples
Films directed by David Lowell Rich
Films set in San Francisco
Films shot in San Francisco